The Barbados racer (Erythrolamprus perfuscus), also commonly known as the tan ground snake, was a species of colubrid snake that was endemic to Barbados. It is now extinct.

History
This species was often believed to be the snake described by Richard Ligon in his "A True and Exact History of the Island of Barbadoes" (1657):
"Having done with Beasts and Birds, we will enquire what other lesser Animalls or Insects there are upon the Iland, of which, Snakes are the chiefe, because the largest; and I have seen some of those a yard and a halfe long."

Conservation status
It is believed to be extinct, as there has not been a confirmed sighting since 1961. Habitat loss is believed to have caused its decline, particularly the land clearance and pesticide use associated with tree crops.

Description
It was colored brown with lighter sides, and light lateral stripes to the rear.

Habitat, behavior, and diet
It probably lived in mesic habitats, and actively foraged during the day for lizards and frogs.

Footnotes

References
.
.

Further reading
Cope, E.D. 1862. Synopsis of the Species of Holcosus and Ameiva, with Diagnoses of new West Indian and South American Colubridæ. Proc. Acad. Nat. Sci. Philadelphia 14: 60–82. (Liophis perfuscus, p. 77.)
Schwartz, A., and R. Thomas. 1975. A Check-list of West Indian Amphibians and Reptiles. Carnegie Museum of Natural History. Pittsburgh, Pennsylvania. 216 pp. (Dromicus perfuscus, p. 183.)

External links

Liophis perfuscus at the Encyclopedia of Life

Erythrolamprus
Snakes of the Caribbean
Reptiles of Barbados
Endemic fauna of Barbados
Reptiles described in 1862
Taxa named by Edward Drinker Cope
Taxonomy articles created by Polbot